The system of orders and medals of the Republic of North Macedonia is regulated by the Law on Awarding Decorations and Recognitions of North Macedonia. The President of North Macedonia awards all orders and medals on behalf of the nation. Awards recommendations are received and reviewed by the Commission on Awarding Decorations and Recognitions, a 14-member body appointed by the president to assist him in carrying out the laws related to orders and decorations. Individuals and organizations, both Macedonian and foreign, are eligible for recognition by the state. Awards are made to recognize achievements in the fields of social, political, economic, or scientific-research works. Recognition may also be made for especially meritorious social and humanitarian aid. Other activities which may be recognized are contributions to the peaceful and stable development of North Macedonia, for contributions to democratic development, for outstanding achievements in work, or for great personal courage in defense of North Macedonia. Awards may be made posthumously.

Orders of North Macedonia
 Order of the Republic of Macedonia (Орден на Република Македонија)
 Order 8-September (Орден 8ми септември)
 Order "Ilinden-1903" (Орденот Илинден 1903)
 Order of Merit for Macedonia (Орден за заслуги за Македонија)
 Order of Military Merits (Орден за воени заслуги)

Medals of North Macedonia
 Medal of Merit for Macedonia
 Medal of Bravery

References

External links

Macedonian Herald, September 2010, Issue 4
Macedonian Herald, July 2011, Issue 5
Ордени и медали на Република Македонија 

 
Macedonian awards